is manga series by Noboru Kawasaki published from 1973 to 1975 by Shogakukan in their elementary school study magazines in the Shogakukan no Gakushō Zasshi series. The manga was collected in four volumes. An anime series adapted from the manga was created by Tatsunoko Productions. The anime was also broadcast in Italy under the title Coccinella. Following Inakappe Taishō in 1970, it was the second of Kawasaki's works to be made into animation by Tatsunoko.

Plot
There are seven young brothers and sisters who grow up peacefully supported by the love and care of their parents. As a token of gratitude, the children present a trip to the couple on their wedding anniversary. This heartfelt deed, however, causes a terrible misfortune as their parents are killed while on their travels. Though it is certainly a shocking tragedy to the youngsters, they cannot be left in sorrow for a long time. Rather they have to make efforts to stand on their own feet in a body without depending on anybody else. So, their strenuous and daring living starts anew helping one another with brotherly affection, and their sincere attitude and lively activities gradually win admiration and encouragement from people of the community.

Cast
The name of the Isshuu family means "one week". Since they are a family of seven children, each of these children represent a day of the week.

The eldest daughter in the family, representing Monday. Tsukimi is 11 years old, and is in the 6th grade. She does a good job regarding housework, and even gets good grades in school. However, she struggles with her mother role in the family. In the Italian dub, she is 16 years old.

The eldest son in the family, but younger than Tsukimi. Represents Tuesday. Kaji is 10 years old, and is in the 5th grade. When it comes to his lifelong dream, he wants to be a baseball player in the original manga, but wants to be a boxer within the anime. He often scolds at the younger siblings in the family when they do not cooperate. He does a good job as the role of a father in the family, in spite of his atrocious grades at school, compared to Tsukimi's. His teacher, Mr. Ban, as punishments, uses methods on him that the Greeks used like forcing children to carry 1, or 2 buckets filled with water while standing still. In the Italian dub, he is 15 years old.

The 2nd son in the family, representing Wednesday. Mizuo is 9 years old, and is in the 4th grade. He has been a prodigy since his first day of school, receiving outstanding grades in his class. He wants to be a scientist when he grows up, since he is constantly working on science experiments within school, and even in his bedroom. In the Italian dub he is 14 years old.

The 3rd son in the family, representing Thursday. Mokusuke is 8 years old, and is in the 3rd grade. He is very fat, but he is a loving soul to the siblings despite this. He wants to be a priest when he grows up, since he performs Buddhist prayers. He is 13 years old in the Italian dub.

The 4th son in the family, representing Friday. Kintaro is 7 years old, and is in the 2nd grade. He is often a bully within school and even his home (to Kaji), but is very kind, and cooperates with his younger brother, Tsuchimaru, only to get into mischief. He wants to be a farmer when he grows up. In the Italian dub, he is 8 years old.

The 5th son in the family, representing Saturday. Tsuchimaru is 6 years old, and is in the first grade. He is quite intelligent compared to his older brother Kintaro, but is more kind and friendly. He even has a skin head. When he grows up, he wishes to be a detective. In the Italian dub, he is 7 years old.

The 2nd daughter in the family and the central character of the series, representing Sunday. Hiyoko is 5 years old, but does not go to school due to her young age. She is very naughty and precocious at times, but she is a friendly girl who depends on the future of her family's lifestyle thanks to Tentomushi, a ladybug she found. She is considered to be the founder of the lifestyle. When she grows up, she wants to be a veterinarian, since she loves animals. Her age remains the same in the Italian dub.

References

External links
 

1973 manga
1974 anime television series debuts
Fuji TV original programming
Tatsunoko Production
Shogakukan franchises
Shogakukan manga